The Planet Satellite was a British light aircraft of the late 1940s. Designed to exploit new technology, the aircraft was abandoned after two crashes although the innovative fuselage was later incorporated into a helicopter prototype.

Design and development
The Planet Satellite was designed by Major J. N. (John Nelson) Dundas Heenan, of Heenan, Winn and Steel, consulting engineers, 29 Clarges Street, London, W.1. Dundas had served in the RFC in WW1, retiring as acting Major in 1919 and had then worked at the family firm of Heenan & Froude, leaving in 1935 when the parent company went bankrupt. He served on the British Air Commission to North America in World War II, and communicated many of Frank Whittle's reports to the USAAF, which eventually led to the Bell P-59 Airacomet, the first US jet aircraft. 

The Satellite was a futuristic looking four-seater aircraft built of Elektron, a 90% magnesium alloy, in a true monocoque 'teardrop' shaped fuselage with no internal reinforced structure. The wings were also skinned with sheet elektron.  The UK manufacturing rights for Elektron were owned by F. A. Hughes and Co., which had acquired the license in 1923 from IG Farben in Germany. Hughes & Co. had been fully owned since 1947 by Distillers Company Ltd., (makers of Gordon's Gin and Johnnie Walker Whisky), who decided to finance the Satellite: a partnership established  
the Planet Aircraft Company, which operated as a subsidiary of a liquor company.

The Satellite was powered by a 250 hp de Havilland Gipsy Queen 31 mounted amidships driving a two-blade Aeromatic "pusher" airscrew in the tail, with cooling air drawn by a fan through a flush slot on the roof of the fuselage. Other notable features included a 'butterfly' V-tail and a retractable tricycle undercarriage with some Elektron components, with the nosewheel retracting into a reinforced keel made of solid Elektron that ran the length of the underside of the fuselage.

Breaking with conventional design and manufacturing conventions, Heenan declared in the July 1948 Aviation News issue, that the 400 drawings made were in stark contrast with the standard of approximately 3,000 drawings required for a project of that complexity. 

Built in the Robinson Redwing factory at Purley Way, Croydon, Surrey in 1947, the first prototype was taken to Redhill Aerodrome in 1948. The sleek light aircraft appeared at the S.B.A.C. show at Farnborough Airshow in September 1948 and received the registration G-ALOI in April 1949.

Testing and evaluation
The Chief Test Pilot at RAE Farnborough, Group Captain H. J. Wilson (holder of the World speed Record in the Gloster Meteor), after several long runs down the runway, managed to get the Satellite airborne at Blackbushe Airport. The first "hop" was followed by the collapse of the undercarriage. After repairs, the prototype was flown off the ground and after reaching an altitude of barely 20 ft was put down on the ground gently but nonetheless, the undercarriage again collapsed, and this time the main keel had been cracked by the force of the landing. The conclusion of the Air Registration Board investigating the incident was that the aircraft had inadequate stress analysis and would require complete re-stressing and redesign.

The manufacturers had already begun the production of a second prototype but having already invested £100,000, and facing a likely cost of a further £50,000 to redesign the Satellite, chose to wind down the program with no further attempts to fly the Planet Satellite.

The second prototype, registered G-ALXP was abandoned but the completed fuselage was incorporated into the Firth Helicopter FH-01/4, (also designed by Heenan) built in 1952 at Thame, Oxfordshire. The Firth Helicopter was abandoned without flying. It was presented to the College of Aeronautics at Cranfield in 1955. 

The single "flying" Satellite languished at Redhill until 1958 when it was unceremoniously broken up.

Specifications (Planet Satellite  - performance estimated)

References

Notes

Bibliography
 "A glimpse into the past". Air Progress, Vol. 40, No. 11, November 1978. pp. 16–18.
 Bridgman, Leonard. Jane's All the World's Aircraft 1948. London: Sampson Low, Marston & Company, Ltd., 1948. 
 Gunston, Bill. Back to the Drawing Board: Aircraft That Flew But Never Took Off. London: Zenith Imprint, 1996. .
 Middleton, Don. "Heavenly Body". Aeroplane Monthly Vol. 11, No. 10, Issue: no, 128, October 1983.
 Orde-Hume, Arthur W. J. G. "Sleeping Satellite". Aeroplane, Vol. 49, No. 12. December 2021. pp. 60–64. .

External links
 Secret projects UK
 Whisky business: The strange story of the Planet Satellite
 "Plane Resembles Torpedo." Popular Science, August 1948, p. 92, bottom of page.
Print Publication Mechanix Illustrated January 1949, p. 80 title "Tail-Prop Plane"

1940s British civil utility aircraft
Low-wing aircraft
Single-engined pusher aircraft
Aircraft first flown in 1949